Thurisazvirus is a genus of viruses in the realm Ribozyviria, containing the single species Thurisazvirus myis. Tome's spiny rat (Proechimys semispinosus) serves as its host.

References 

Virus genera